Michael G. Connelly is a former Republican member of the Illinois Senate, representing the 21st district, from 2013 to 2019. He previously served in the Illinois House of Representatives from 2009 to 2012.

Political career 
Connelly served as a Lisle village trustee from 2001 to 2006. In 2006, he was elected to the DuPage County Board, representing the 5th district.

In 2008, he was elected to the Illinois House of Representatives, representing the 48th district.

In 2012, he was elected to the Illinois Senate, representing the 21st district. While in the Senate, Connelly served as the Assistant Minority Leader. In 2018, he lost reelection to Democratic candidate Laura Ellman by a margin of 1179 votes.

Personal life 
Connelly was born in Chicago and raised in La Grange. He graduated from Loyola University in 1986 and the John Marshall Law School in 1989. Connelly previously served as an assistant State's Attorney in Cook County and as a law clerk to Justice Allan Stouder of the Illinois Appellate Court. He has been in the private practice of law for over 20 years.

Connelly and his wife, Lisa, have three children.

References

External links
Senator Michael Connelly (R) 21st District at the Illinois General Assembly
By session: 98th, 97th, 96th
 
Michael Connelly at Illinois House Republican Caucus

Living people
John Marshall Law School (Chicago) alumni
Loyola University Chicago alumni
Republican Party members of the Illinois House of Representatives
Republican Party Illinois state senators
21st-century American politicians
County board members in Illinois
Year of birth missing (living people)